Bogusława Pietkiewicz (16 August 1944 – 27 January 2012) was a Polish diver. She competed in two events at the 1968 Summer Olympics.

References

1944 births
2012 deaths
Polish female divers
Olympic divers of Poland
Divers at the 1968 Summer Olympics
People from Sokołów County
20th-century Polish women